Gasoline or petrol (see ) is a transparent, petroleum-derived flammable liquid that is used primarily as a fuel in most spark-ignited internal combustion engines (also known as petrol engines). It consists mostly of organic compounds obtained by the fractional distillation of petroleum, enhanced with a variety of additives. On average, U.S. refineries produce, from a barrel of crude oil, about 19 to 20 gallons of gasoline; 11 to 13 gallons of distillate fuel (most of which is sold as diesel fuel); and 3 to 4 gallons of jet fuel.  The product ratio depends on the processing in an oil refinery and the crude oil assay. A barrel of oil is defined as holding 42 US gallons, which is about 159 liters or 35 imperial gallons.

The characteristic of a particular gasoline blend to resist igniting too early (which causes knocking and reduces efficiency in reciprocating engines) is measured by its octane rating, which is produced in several grades. Tetraethyl lead and other lead compounds, once widely used to increase octane ratings, are no longer used except in aviation, off-road and auto-racing applications. Other chemicals are frequently added to gasoline to improve chemical stability and performance characteristics, control corrosiveness, and provide fuel system cleaning. Gasoline may contain oxygen-containing chemicals such as ethanol, MTBE, or ETBE to improve combustion.

Gasoline can enter the environment (uncombusted), both as liquid and as vapor, from leakage and handling during production, transport, and delivery (e.g., from storage tanks, from spills, etc.). As an example of efforts to control such leakage, many underground storage tanks are required to have extensive measures in place to detect and prevent such leaks. Gasoline contains known carcinogens.

Etymology
"Gasoline" (often shortened to "gas" and differentiated from avgas in the names "motor gas" or "mogas") is an American word that denotes fuel for automobiles. The term is thought to have been influenced by the trademark "Cazeline" or "Gazeline", named after the surname of British publisher, coffee merchant, and social campaigner John Cassell. On 27 November 1862, Cassell placed an advertisement in The Times of London:

This is the earliest occurrence of the word to have been found. Cassell discovered that a shopkeeper in Dublin named Samuel Boyd was selling counterfeit cazeline and wrote to him to ask him to stop. Boyd did not reply and changed every 'C' into a 'G', thus coining the word "gazeline". The Oxford English Dictionary dates its first recorded use to 1863 when it was spelled "gasolene". The term "gasoline" was first used in North America in 1864.

In most Commonwealth countries (except Canada), the product is called "petrol", rather than "gasoline". The word petroleum, originally used to refer to various types of mineral oils and literally meaning "rock oil", comes from Medieval Latin  (petra, "rock", and oleum, "oil"). "Petrol" was used as a product name in about 1870, as the name of a refined mineral oil product sold by British wholesaler Carless, Capel & Leonard, which marketed it as a solvent. When the product later found a new use as a motor fuel, Frederick Simms, an associate of Gottlieb Daimler, suggested to John Leonard, the owner of Carless, that they register the trademark "Petrol", but by that time the word was already in general use, possibly inspired by the French pétrole, and the registration was not allowed because the word was a general descriptor; Carless was still able to defend its use of "Petrol" as a product name due to their having sold it under that name for many years by then. Carless registered a number of alternative names for the product, but "petrol" nonetheless became the common term for the fuel in the British Commonwealth.

British refiners originally used "motor spirit" as a generic name for the automotive fuel and "aviation spirit" for aviation gasoline. When Carless was denied a trademark on "petrol" in the 1930s, its competitors switched to the more popular name "petrol". However, "motor spirit" had already made its way into laws and regulations, so the term remains in use as a formal name for petrol. The term is used most widely in Nigeria, where the largest petroleum companies call their product "premium motor spirit". Although "petrol" has made inroads into Nigerian English, "premium motor spirit" remains the formal name that is used in scientific publications, government reports, and newspapers.

The use of the word gasoline instead of petrol is uncommon outside North America, although gasolina is used in Spanish and Portuguese.

In many languages, the name of the product is derived from benzene, such as Benzin in Persian and German or benzina in Italian; but in Argentina, Uruguay, and Paraguay, the colloquial name nafta is derived from that of the chemical naphtha.

Some languages, like French and Italian, use the respective words for gasoline to indicate diesel fuel.

History
The first internal combustion engines suitable for use in transportation applications, so-called Otto engines, were developed in Germany during the last quarter of the 19th century. The fuel for these early engines was a relatively volatile hydrocarbon obtained from coal gas. With a boiling point near  (n-octane boils about higher), it was well-suited for early carburetors (evaporators). The development of a "spray nozzle" carburetor enabled the use of less volatile fuels. Further improvements in engine efficiency were attempted at higher compression ratios, but early attempts were blocked by the premature explosion of fuel, known as knocking.

In 1891, the Shukhov cracking process became the world's first commercial method to break down heavier hydrocarbons in crude oil to increase the percentage of lighter products compared to simple distillation.

1903 to 1914
The evolution of gasoline followed the evolution of oil as the dominant source of energy in the industrializing world. Before World War One, Britain was the world's greatest industrial power and depended on its navy to protect the shipping of raw materials from its colonies. Germany was also industrializing and, like Britain, lacked many natural resources which had to be shipped to the home country. By the 1890s, Germany began to pursue a policy of global prominence and began building a navy to compete with Britain's. Coal was the fuel that powered their navies. Though both Britain and Germany had natural coal reserves, new developments in oil as a fuel for ships changed the situation. Coal-powered ships were a tactical weakness because the process of loading coal was extremely slow and dirty and left the ship completely vulnerable to attack, and unreliable supplies of coal at international ports made long-distance voyages impractical. The advantages of petroleum oil soon found the navies of the world converting to oil, but Britain and Germany had very few domestic oil reserves. Britain eventually solved its naval oil dependence by securing oil from Royal Dutch Shell and the Anglo-Persian Oil Company and this determined from where and of what quality its gasoline would come.

During the early period of gasoline engine development, aircraft were forced to use motor vehicle gasoline since aviation gasoline did not yet exist. These early fuels were termed "straight-run" gasolines and were byproducts from the distillation of a single crude oil to produce kerosene, which was the principal product sought for burning in kerosene lamps. Gasoline production would not surpass kerosene production until 1916. The earliest straight-run gasolines were the result of distilling eastern crude oils and there was no mixing of distillates from different crudes. The composition of these early fuels was unknown and the quality varied greatly as crude oils from different oil fields emerged in different mixtures of hydrocarbons in different ratios. The engine effects produced by abnormal combustion (engine knocking and pre-ignition) due to inferior fuels had not yet been identified, and as a result, there was no rating of gasoline in terms of its resistance to abnormal combustion. The general specification by which early gasolines were measured was that of specific gravity via the Baumé scale and later the volatility (tendency to vaporize) specified in terms of boiling points, which became the primary focuses for gasoline producers. These early eastern crude oil gasolines had relatively high Baumé test results (65 to 80 degrees Baumé) and were called "Pennsylvania high-test" or simply "high-test" gasolines. These were often used in aircraft engines.

By 1910, increased automobile production and the resultant increase in gasoline consumption produced a greater demand for gasoline. Also, the growing electrification of lighting produced a drop in kerosene demand, creating a supply problem. It appeared that the burgeoning oil industry would be trapped into over-producing kerosene and under-producing gasoline since simple distillation could not alter the ratio of the two products from any given crude. The solution appeared in 1911 when the development of the Burton process allowed thermal cracking of crude oils, which increased the percent yield of gasoline from the heavier hydrocarbons. This was combined with the expansion of foreign markets for the export of surplus kerosene which domestic markets no longer needed. These new thermally "cracked" gasolines were believed to have no harmful effects and would be added to straight-run gasolines. There also was the practice of mixing heavy and light distillates to achieve the desired Baumé reading and collectively these were called "blended" gasolines.

Gradually, volatility gained favor over the Baumé test, though both continued to be used in combination to specify a gasoline. As late as June 1917, Standard Oil (the largest refiner of crude oil in the United States at the time) stated that the most important property of a gasoline was its volatility. It is estimated that the rating equivalent of these straight-run gasolines varied from 40 to 60 octane and that the "high-test", sometimes referred to as "fighting grade", probably averaged 50 to 65 octane.

World War I
Prior to the American entry into World War I, the European Allies used fuels derived from crude oils from Borneo, Java, and Sumatra, which gave satisfactory performance in their military aircraft. When the U.S. entered the war in April 1917, the U.S. became the principal supplier of aviation gasoline to the Allies and a decrease in engine performance was noted. Soon it was realized that motor vehicle fuels were unsatisfactory for aviation, and after the loss of several combat aircraft, attention turned to the quality of the gasolines being used. Later flight tests conducted in 1937 showed that an octane reduction of 13 points (from 100 down to 87 octane) decreased engine performance by 20 percent and increased take-off distance by 45 percent. If abnormal combustion were to occur, the engine could lose enough power to make getting airborne impossible and a take-off roll became a threat to the pilot and aircraft.

On 2 August 1917, the U.S. Bureau of Mines arranged to study fuels for aircraft in cooperation with the Aviation Section of the U.S. Army Signal Corps and a general survey concluded that no reliable data existed for the proper fuels for aircraft. As a result, flight tests began at Langley, McCook and Wright fields to determine how different gasolines performed under different conditions. These tests showed that in certain aircraft, motor vehicle gasolines performed as well as "high-test" but in other types resulted in hot-running engines. It was also found that gasolines from aromatic and naphthenic base crude oils from California, South Texas, and Venezuela resulted in smooth-running engines. These tests resulted in the first government specifications for motor gasolines (aviation gasolines used the same specifications as motor gasolines) in late 1917.

U.S., 1918–1929 
Engine designers knew that, according to the Otto cycle, power and efficiency increased with compression ratio, but experience with early gasolines during World War I showed that higher compression ratios increased the risk of abnormal combustion, producing lower power, lower efficiency, hot-running engines, and potentially severe engine damage. To compensate for these poor fuels, early engines used low compression ratios, which required relatively large, heavy engines with limited power and efficiency. This was a major concern for aircraft designers and the needs of the aviation industry provoked the search for fuels that could be used in higher-compression engines.

Between 1917 and 1919, the amount of thermally cracked gasoline utilized almost doubled. Also, the use of natural gasoline increased greatly. During this period, many U.S. states established specifications for motor gasoline but none of these agreed and they were unsatisfactory from one standpoint or another. Larger oil refiners began to specify unsaturated material percentage (thermally cracked products caused gumming in both use and storage while unsaturated hydrocarbons are more reactive and tend to combine with impurities leading to gumming). In 1922, the U.S. government published the first specifications for aviation gasolines (two grades were designated as "fighting" and "domestic" and were governed by boiling points, color, sulfur content, and a gum formation test) along with one "motor" grade for automobiles. The gum test essentially eliminated thermally cracked gasoline from aviation usage and thus aviation gasolines reverted to fractionating straight-run naphthas or blending straight-run and highly treated thermally cracked naphthas. This situation persisted until 1929.

The automobile industry reacted to the increase in thermally cracked gasoline with alarm. Thermal cracking produced large amounts of both mono- and diolefins (unsaturated hydrocarbons), which increased the risk of gumming. Also, the volatility was decreasing to the point that fuel did not vaporize and was sticking to spark plugs and fouling them, creating hard starting and rough running in winter and sticking to cylinder walls, bypassing the pistons and rings, and going into the crankcase oil. One journal stated, "on a multi-cylinder engine in a high-priced car we are diluting the oil in the crankcase as much as 40 percent in a  run, as the analysis of the oil in the oil-pan shows".

Being very unhappy with the consequent reduction in overall gasoline quality, automobile manufacturers suggested imposing a quality standard on the oil suppliers. The oil industry in turn accused the automakers of not doing enough to improve vehicle economy, and the dispute became known within the two industries as "the fuel problem". Animosity grew between the industries, each accusing the other of not doing anything to resolve matters, and their relationship deteriorated. The situation was only resolved when the American Petroleum Institute (API) initiated a conference to address the fuel problem and a cooperative fuel research (CFR) committee was established in 1920, to oversee joint investigative programs and solutions. Apart from representatives of the two industries, the Society of Automotive Engineers (SAE) also played an instrumental role, with the U.S. Bureau of Standards being chosen as an impartial research organization to carry out many of the studies. Initially, all the programs were related to volatility and fuel consumption, ease of starting, crankcase oil dilution, and acceleration.

Leaded gasoline controversy, 1924–1925
With the increased use of thermally cracked gasolines came an increased concern regarding its effects on abnormal combustion, and this led to research for antiknock additives. In the late 1910s, researchers such as A.H. Gibson, Harry Ricardo, Thomas Midgley Jr., and Thomas Boyd began to investigate abnormal combustion. Beginning in 1916, Charles F. Kettering of General Motors began investigating additives based on two paths, the "high percentage" solution (where large quantities of ethanol were added) and the "low percentage" solution (where only 0.53-1.1 g/L or 0.071-0.147 oz / U.S. gal were needed). The "low percentage" solution ultimately led to the discovery of tetraethyllead (TEL) in December 1921, a product of the research of Midgley and Boyd and the defining component of leaded gasoline. This innovation started a cycle of improvements in fuel efficiency that coincided with the large-scale development of oil refining to provide more products in the boiling range of gasoline. Ethanol could not be patented but TEL could, so Kettering secured a patent for TEL and began promoting it instead of other options.

The dangers of compounds containing lead were well-established by then and Kettering was directly warned by Robert Wilson of MIT, Reid Hunt of Harvard, Yandell Henderson of Yale, and Erik Krause of the University of Potsdam in Germany about its use. Krause had worked on tetraethyllead for many years and called it "a creeping and malicious poison" that had killed a member of his dissertation committee. On 27 October 1924, newspaper articles around the nation told of the workers at the Standard Oil refinery near Elizabeth, New Jersey who were producing TEL and were suffering from lead poisoning. By 30 October, the death toll had reached five. In November, the New Jersey Labor Commission closed the Bayway refinery and a grand jury investigation was started which had resulted in no charges by February 1925. Leaded gasoline sales were banned in New York City, Philadelphia, and New Jersey. General Motors, DuPont, and Standard Oil, who were partners in Ethyl Corporation, the company created to produce TEL, began to argue that there were no alternatives to leaded gasoline that would maintain fuel efficiency and still prevent engine knocking. After several industry-funded flawed studies reported that TEL-treated gasoline was not a public health issue, the controversy subsided.

U.S., 1930–1941
In the five years prior to 1929, a great amount of experimentation was conducted on different testing methods for determining fuel resistance to abnormal combustion. It appeared engine knocking was dependent on a wide variety of parameters including compression, ignition timing, cylinder temperature, air-cooled or water-cooled engines, chamber shapes, intake temperatures, lean or rich mixtures, and others. This led to a confusing variety of test engines that gave conflicting results, and no standard rating scale existed. By 1929, it was recognized by most aviation gasoline manufacturers and users that some kind of antiknock rating must be included in government specifications. In 1929, the octane rating scale was adopted, and in 1930, the first octane specification for aviation fuels was established. In the same year, the U.S. Army Air Force specified fuels rated at 87 octane for its aircraft as a result of studies it had conducted.

During this period, research showed that hydrocarbon structure was extremely important to the antiknocking properties of fuel. Straight-chain paraffins in the boiling range of gasoline had low antiknock qualities while ring-shaped molecules such as aromatic hydrocarbons (for example benzene) had higher resistance to knocking. This development led to the search for processes that would produce more of these compounds from crude oils than achieved under straight distillation or thermal cracking. Research by the major refiners led to the development of processes involving isomerization of cheap and abundant butane to isobutane, and alkylation to join isobutane and butylenes to form isomers of octane such as "isooctane", which became an important component in aviation fuel blending. To further complicate the situation, as engine performance increased, the altitude that aircraft could reach also increased, which resulted in concerns about the fuel freezing. Substituted aromatics such as toluene, xylene, and cumene, combined with limited benzene, solved the problem.

By 1935, there were seven different aviation grades based on octane rating, two Army grades, four Navy grades, and three commercial grades including the introduction of 100-octane aviation gasoline. By 1937, the Army established 100-octane as the standard fuel for combat aircraft, and to add to the confusion, the government now recognized 14 different grades, in addition to 11 others in foreign countries. With some companies required to stock 14 grades of aviation fuel, none of which could be interchanged, the effect on the refiners was negative. The refining industry could not concentrate on large capacity conversion processes for so many different grades and a solution had to be found. By 1941, principally through the efforts of the Cooperative Fuel Research Committee, the number of grades for aviation fuels was reduced to three: 73, 91, and 100 octane.

The development of 100-octane aviation gasoline on an economic scale was due in part to Jimmy Doolittle, who had become Aviation Manager of Shell Oil Company. He convinced Shell to invest in refining capacity to produce 100-octane on a scale that nobody needed since no aircraft existed that required a fuel that nobody made. Some fellow employees would call his effort "Doolittle's million-dollar blunder" but time would prove Doolittle correct. In 1929, Stanavo Specification Board Inc. was organized by the Standard Oil companies of California, Indiana, and New Jersey to improve aviation fuels and oils and by 1935 had placed their first 100 octane fuel on the market, Stanavo Ethyl Gasoline 100. It was used by the Army, engine manufacturers and airlines for testing and for air racing and record flights. By 1936, tests at Wright Field using the new, cheaper alternatives to pure octane proved the value of 100 octane fuel, and both Shell and Standard Oil would win the contract to supply test quantities for the Army.

In 1937, Eugene Houdry developed the Houdry process of catalytic cracking, which produced a high-octane base stock of gasoline which was superior to the thermally cracked product since it did not contain the high concentration of olefins. In 1940, there were only 14 Houdry units in operation in the U.S.; by 1943, this had increased to 77, either of the Houdry process or of the Thermofor Catalytic or Fluid Catalyst type.

The search for fuels with octane ratings above 100 led to the extension of the scale by comparing power output. A fuel designated grade 130 would produce 130 percent as much power in an engine as it would running on pure iso-octane. During WWII, fuels above 100-octane were given two ratings, a rich and a lean mixture, and these would be called 'performance numbers' (PN). 100-octane aviation gasoline would be referred to as 130/100 grade.

World War II

Germany
Oil and its byproducts, especially high-octane aviation gasoline, would prove to be a driving concern for how Germany conducted the war. Because captured supplies and oil fields would be necessary to fuel the campaign, the German high command created a special squad of oilfield experts drawn from the ranks of domestic oil industries. They were sent in to put out oilfield fires and get production going again as soon as possible. But capturing oilfields remained an obstacle throughout the war. During the Invasion of Poland, German estimates of gasoline consumption turned out to be vastly too low. When they were engaged in combat across open country, gasoline consumption almost doubled. On the second day of battle, a unit of the XIX Corps was forced to halt when it ran out of gasoline. One of the major objectives of the Polish invasion was their oil fields but the Soviets invaded and captured 70 percent of the Polish production before the Germans could reach it. Through the German–Soviet Commercial Agreement (1940), Stalin agreed in vague terms to supply Germany with additional oil equal to that produced by now Soviet-occupied Polish oilfields at Drohobych and Boryslav in exchange for hard coal and steel tubing.

Even after the Nazis conquered the vast territories of Europe, this did not help the gasoline shortage. This area had never been self-sufficient in oil before the war. In 1940, total production under German control amounted to only . By early 1941 and the depletion of German gasoline reserves, Adolf Hitler saw the invasion of Russia to seize the Polish oil fields and the Russian oil in the Caucasus as the solution to the German gasoline shortage. As early as July 1941, following the 22 June start of Operation Barbarossa, certain Luftwaffe squadrons were forced to curtail ground support missions due to shortages of aviation gasoline. On 9 October, the German quartermaster general estimated that army vehicles were  short of gasoline requirements.

Virtually all of Germany's aviation gasoline came from synthetic oil plants that hydrogenated coals and coal tars. These processes had been developed during the 1930s as an effort to achieve fuel independence. There were two grades of aviation gasoline produced in volume in Germany, the B-4 or blue grade and the C-3 or green grade, which accounted for about two-thirds of all production. B-4 was equivalent to 89-octane and the C-3 was roughly equal to the U.S. 100-octane, though lean mixture was rated around 95-octane and was poorer than the U.S. version. Maximum output achieved in 1943 reached  a day before the Allies decided to target the synthetic fuel plants. Through captured enemy aircraft and analysis of the gasoline found in them, both the Allies and the Axis powers were aware of the quality of the aviation gasoline being produced and this prompted an octane race to achieve the advantage in aircraft performance. Later in the war, the C-3 grade was improved to where it was equivalent to the U.S. 150 grade (rich mixture rating).

Japan
Japan, like Germany, had almost no domestic oil supply and by the late 1930s, produced only seven percent of its own oil while importing the rest—80 percent from the U.S.. As Japanese aggression grew in China (USS Panay incident) and news reached the American public of Japanese bombing of civilian centers, especially the bombing of Chungking, public opinion began to support a U.S. embargo. A Gallup poll in June 1939 found that 72 percent of the American public supported an embargo on war materials to Japan. This increased tensions between the U.S. and Japan, and it led to the U.S. placing restrictions on exports. In July 1940, the U.S. issued a proclamation that banned the export of 87 octane or higher aviation gasoline to Japan. This ban did not hinder the Japanese as their aircraft could operate with fuels below 87 octane and if needed they could add TEL to increase the octane. As it turned out, Japan bought 550 percent more sub-87 octane aviation gasoline in the five months after the July 1940 ban on higher octane sales. The possibility of a complete ban of gasoline from America created friction in the Japanese government as to what action to take to secure more supplies from the Dutch East Indies and demanded greater oil exports from the exiled Dutch government after the Battle of the Netherlands. This action prompted the U.S. to move its Pacific fleet from Southern California to Pearl Harbor to help stiffen British resolve to stay in Indochina. With the Japanese invasion of French Indochina in September 1940, came great concerns about the possible Japanese invasion of the Dutch Indies to secure their oil. After the U.S. banned all exports of steel and iron scrap, the next day, Japan signed the Tripartite Pact and this led Washington to fear that a complete U.S. oil embargo would prompt the Japanese to invade the Dutch East Indies. On 16 June 1941 Harold Ickes, who was appointed Petroleum Coordinator for National Defense, stopped a shipment of oil from Philadelphia to Japan in light of the oil shortage on the East coast due to increased exports to Allies. He also telegrammed all oil suppliers on the East coast not to ship any oil to Japan without his permission. President Roosevelt countermanded Ickes's orders telling Ickes that the "I simply have not got enough Navy to go around and every little episode in the Pacific means fewer ships in the Atlantic". On 25 July 1941, the U.S. froze all Japanese financial assets and licenses would be required for each use of the frozen funds including oil purchases that could produce aviation gasoline. On 28 July 1941, Japan invaded southern Indochina.

The debate inside the Japanese government as to its oil and gasoline situation was leading to invasion of the Dutch East Indies but this would mean war with the U.S., whose Pacific fleet was a threat to their flank. This situation led to the decision to attack the U.S. fleet at Pearl Harbor before proceeding with the Dutch East Indies invasion. On 7 December 1941, Japan attacked Pearl Harbor, and the next day the Netherlands declared war on Japan, which initiated the Dutch East Indies campaign. But the Japanese missed a golden opportunity at Pearl Harbor. "All of the oil for the fleet was in surface tanks at the time of Pearl Harbor", Admiral Chester Nimitz, who became Commander in Chief of the Pacific Fleet, was later to say. Had the Japanese destroyed the oil," he added, "it would have prolonged the war another two years."

U.S.
Early in 1944, William Boyd, president of the American Petroleum Institute and chairman of the Petroleum Industry War Council said: "The Allies may have floated to victory on a wave of oil in World War I, but in this infinitely greater World War II, we are flying to victory on the wings of petroleum". In December 1941 the U.S. had 385,000 oil wells producing  barrels of oil a year and 100-octane aviation gasoline capacity was at  a day. By 1944, the U.S. was producing over  a year (67 percent of world production) and the petroleum industry had built 122 new plants for the production of 100-octane aviation gasoline and capacity was over  a day—an increase of more than ten-fold. The record of gasoline consumption by the Army prior to June 1943 was uncoordinated as each supply service of the Army purchased its own petroleum products and no centralized system of control nor records existed. World War II marked the first time in U.S. history that gasoline was rationed and the government imposed price controls to prevent inflation.

Even with the world's largest aviation gasoline production, the U.S. military still found that more was needed. Throughout the duration of the war, aviation gasoline supply was always behind requirements and this impacted training and operations. The reason for this shortage developed before the war even began. The free market did not support the expense of producing 100-octane aviation fuel in large volume, especially during the Great Depression. Though only three percent of U.S. combat aircraft in 1935 could take full advantage of the higher octane due to low compression ratios, the Army saw that the need for increasing performance warranted the expense and purchased 100,000 gallons. By 1937, the Army established 100-octane as the standard fuel for combat aircraft and by 1939 production was only  a day. In effect, the U.S. military was the only market for 100-octane aviation gasoline and as war broke out in Europe this created a supply problem that persisted throughout the duration.

With the war in Europe a reality in 1939, all predictions of 100-octane consumption were outrunning all possible production. Neither the Army nor the Navy could contract more than six months in advance for fuel and they could not supply the funds for plant expansion. Without a long-term guaranteed market, the petroleum industry would not risk its capital to expand production for a product that only the government would buy. The solution to the expansion of storage, transportation, finances, and production was the creation of the Defense Supplies Corporation on 19 September 1940. The Defense Supplies Corporation would buy, transport and store all aviation gasoline for the Army and Navy at cost plus a carrying fee.

When the Allied breakout after D-Day found their armies stretching their supply lines to a dangerous point, the makeshift solution was the Red Ball Express. But even this soon was inadequate. The trucks in the convoys had to drive longer distances as the armies advanced and they were consuming a greater percentage of the same gasoline they were trying to deliver. In 1944, General George Patton's Third Army finally stalled just short of the German border after running out of gasoline. The general was so upset at the arrival of a truckload of rations instead of gasoline he was reported to have shouted: "Hell, they send us food, when they know we can fight without food but not without oil." The solution had to wait for the repairing of the railroad lines and bridges so that the more efficient trains could replace the gasoline-consuming truck convoys.

U.S., 1946–present

The development of jet engines burning kerosene-based fuels during WWII for aircraft produced a superior performing propulsion system than internal combustion engines could offer and the U.S. military forces gradually replaced their piston combat aircraft with jet powered planes. This development would essentially remove the military need for ever increasing octane fuels and eliminated government support for the refining industry to pursue the research and production of such exotic and expensive fuels. Commercial aviation was slower to adapt to jet propulsion and until 1958, when the Boeing 707 first entered commercial service, piston powered airliners still relied on aviation gasoline. But commercial aviation had greater economic concerns than the maximum performance that the military could afford. As octane numbers increased so did the cost of gasoline but the incremental increase in efficiency becomes less as compression ratio goes up. This reality set a practical limit to how high compression ratios could increase relative to how expensive the gasoline would become. This compares to the Wright Brothers engine needing almost  of engine weight to produce .

The U.S. automobile industry after WWII could not take advantage of the high octane fuels then available. Automobile compression ratios increased from an average of 5.3-to-1 in 1931 to just 6.7-to-1 in 1946. The average octane number of regular-grade motor gasoline increased from 58 to 70 during the same time. Military aircraft were using expensive turbo-supercharged engines that cost at least 10 times as much per horsepower as automobile engines and had to be overhauled every 700 to 1,000 hours. The automobile market could not support such expensive engines. It would not be until 1957 that the first U.S. automobile manufacturer could mass-produce an engine that would produce one horsepower per cubic inch, the Chevrolet 283 hp/283 cubic inch V-8 engine option in the Corvette. At $485, this was an expensive option that few consumers could afford and would only appeal to the performance-oriented consumer market willing to pay for the premium fuel required. This engine had an advertised compression ratio of 10.5-to-1 and the 1958 AMA Specifications stated that the octane requirement was 96–100 RON. At  (1959 with aluminum intake), it took  of engine weight to make .

In the 1950s, oil refineries started to focus on high octane fuels, and then detergents were added to gasoline to clean the jets in carburetors. The 1970s witnessed greater attention to the environmental consequences of burning gasoline. These considerations led to the phasing out of TEL and its replacement by other antiknock compounds. Subsequently, low-sulfur gasoline was introduced, in part to preserve the catalysts in modern exhaust systems.

Chemical analysis and production

Commercial gasoline is a mixture of a large number of different hydrocarbons. Gasoline is produced to meet a host of engine performance specifications and many different compositions are possible. Hence, the exact chemical composition of gasoline is undefined. The performance specification also varies with season, requiring more volatile blends (due to added butane) during winter, in order to be able to start a cold engine. At the refinery, the composition varies according to the crude oils from which it is produced, the type of processing units present at the refinery, how those units are operated, and which hydrocarbon streams (blendstocks) the refinery opts to use when blending the final product.

Gasoline is produced in oil refineries. Roughly  of gasoline is derived from a barrel of crude oil. Material separated from crude oil via distillation, called virgin or straight-run gasoline, does not meet specifications for modern engines (particularly the octane rating; see below), but can be pooled to the gasoline blend.

The bulk of a typical gasoline consists of a homogeneous mixture of small, relatively lightweight hydrocarbons with between 4 and 12 carbon atoms per molecule (commonly referred to as C4–C12). It is a mixture of paraffins (alkanes), olefins (alkenes), and cycloalkanes (naphthenes). The use of the term paraffin in place of the standard chemical nomenclature alkane is particular to the oil industry. The actual ratio of molecules in any gasoline depends upon:

 the oil refinery that makes the gasoline, as not all refineries have the same set of processing units;
 the crude oil feed used by the refinery;
 the grade of gasoline (in particular, the octane rating).

The various refinery streams blended to make gasoline have different characteristics. Some important streams include the following:

 Straight-run gasoline, sometimes referred to as Naphtha, is distilled directly from crude oil. Once the leading source of fuel, its low octane rating required lead additives. It is low in aromatics (depending on the grade of the crude oil stream) and contains some cycloalkanes (naphthenes) and no olefins (alkenes). Between 0 and 20 percent of this stream is pooled into the finished gasoline because the quantity of this fraction in the crude is less than fuel demand and the fraction's Research Octane Number (RON) is too low. The chemical properties (namely RON and Reid vapor pressure (RVP)) of the straight-run gasoline can be improved through reforming and isomerization. However, before feeding those units, the naphtha needs to be split into light and heavy naphtha. Straight-run gasoline can also be used as a feedstock for steam-crackers to produce olefins.
 Reformate, produced in a catalytic reformer, has a high octane rating with high aromatic content and relatively low olefin content. Most of the benzene, toluene, and xylene (the so-called BTX hydrocarbons) are more valuable as chemical feedstocks and are thus removed to some extent.
 Catalytic cracked gasoline, or catalytic cracked naphtha, produced with a catalytic cracker, has a moderate octane rating, high olefin content, and moderate aromatic content.
 Hydrocrackate (heavy, mid, and light), produced with a hydrocracker, has a medium to low octane rating and moderate aromatic levels.
 Alkylate is produced in an alkylation unit, using isobutane and olefins as feedstocks. Finished alkylate contains no aromatics or olefins and has a high MON (Motor Octane Number).
 Isomerate is obtained by isomerizing low-octane straight-run gasoline into iso-paraffins (non-chain alkanes, such as isooctane). Isomerate has a medium RON and MON, but no aromatics or olefins.
 Butane is usually blended in the gasoline pool, although the quantity of this stream is limited by the RVP specification.

The terms above are the jargon used in the oil industry, and the terminology varies.

Currently, many countries set limits on gasoline aromatics in general, benzene in particular, and olefin (alkene) content. Such regulations have led to an increasing preference for alkane isomers, such as isomerate or alkylate, as their octane rating is higher than n-alkanes. In the European Union, the benzene limit is set at one percent by volume for all grades of automotive gasoline. This is usually achieved by avoiding feeding C6, in particular cyclohexane, to the reformer unit, where it would be converted to benzene. Therefore, only (desulfurized) heavy virgin naphtha (HVN) is fed to the reformer unit 

Gasoline can also contain other organic compounds, such as organic ethers (deliberately added), plus small levels of contaminants, in particular organosulfur compounds (which are usually removed at the refinery).

Physical properties

Density
The specific gravity of gasoline ranges from 0.71 to 0.77, with higher densities having a greater volume fraction of aromatics. Because of its low density, gasoline floats on water, and therefore water cannot generally be used to extinguish a gasoline fire unless applied in a fine mist.

Stability

Quality gasoline should be stable for six months if stored properly, but can degrade over time. Gasoline stored for a year will most likely be able to be burned in an internal combustion engine without too much trouble. However, the effects of long-term storage will become more noticeable with each passing month until a time comes when the gasoline should be diluted with ever-increasing amounts of freshly made fuel so that the older gasoline may be used up. If left undiluted, improper operation will occur and this may include engine damage from misfiring or the lack of proper action of the fuel within a fuel injection system and from an onboard computer attempting to compensate (if applicable to the vehicle). Gasoline should ideally be stored in an airtight container (to prevent oxidation or water vapor mixing in with the gas) that can withstand the vapor pressure of the gasoline without venting (to prevent the loss of the more volatile fractions) at a stable cool temperature (to reduce the excess pressure from liquid expansion and to reduce the rate of any decomposition reactions). When gasoline is not stored correctly, gums and solids may result, which can corrode system components and accumulate on wet surfaces, resulting in a condition called "stale fuel". Gasoline containing ethanol is especially subject to absorbing atmospheric moisture, then forming gums, solids, or two phases (a hydrocarbon phase floating on top of a water-alcohol phase).

The presence of these degradation products in the fuel tank or fuel lines plus a carburetor or fuel injection components makes it harder to start the engine or causes reduced engine performance. On resumption of regular engine use, the buildup may or may not be eventually cleaned out by the flow of fresh gasoline. The addition of a fuel stabilizer to gasoline can extend the life of fuel that is not or cannot be stored properly, though removal of all fuel from a fuel system is the only real solution to the problem of long-term storage of an engine or a machine or vehicle. Typical fuel stabilizers are proprietary mixtures containing mineral spirits, isopropyl alcohol, 1,2,4-trimethylbenzene or other additives. Fuel stabilizers are commonly used for small engines, such as lawnmower and tractor engines, especially when their use is sporadic or seasonal (little to no use for one or more seasons of the year). Users have been advised to keep gasoline containers more than half full and properly capped to reduce air exposure, to avoid storage at high temperatures, to run an engine for ten minutes to circulate the stabilizer through all components prior to storage, and to run the engine at intervals to purge stale fuel from the carburetor.

Gasoline stability requirements are set by the standard ASTM D4814. This standard describes the various characteristics and requirements of automotive fuels for use over a wide range of operating conditions in ground vehicles equipped with spark-ignition engines.

Combustion energy content

A gasoline-fueled internal combustion engine obtains energy from the combustion of gasoline's various hydrocarbons with oxygen from the ambient air, yielding carbon dioxide and water as exhaust. The combustion of octane, a representative species, performs the chemical reaction:

 

Gasoline blends differ, and therefore actual energy content varies according to the season and producer by up to 1.75 percent more or less than the average. The remainder is products ranging from tar to naphtha.

A high-octane-rated fuel, such as liquefied petroleum gas (LPG), has an overall lower power output at the typical 10:1 compression ratio of an engine design optimized for gasoline fuel. An engine tuned for LPG fuel via higher compression ratios (typically 12:1) improves the power output. This is because higher-octane fuels allow for a higher compression ratio without knocking, resulting in a higher cylinder temperature, which improves efficiency. Also, increased mechanical efficiency is created by a higher compression ratio through the concomitant higher expansion ratio on the power stroke, which is by far the greater effect. The higher expansion ratio extracts more work from the high-pressure gas created by the combustion process. An Atkinson cycle engine uses the timing of the valve events to produce the benefits of a high expansion ratio without the disadvantages, chiefly detonation, of a high compression ratio. A high expansion ratio is also one of the two key reasons for the efficiency of diesel engines, along with the elimination of pumping losses due to throttling of the intake airflow.

The lower energy content of LPG by liquid volume in comparison to gasoline is due mainly to its lower density. This lower density is a property of the lower molecular weight of propane (LPG's chief component) compared to gasoline's blend of various hydrocarbon compounds with heavier molecular weights than propane. Conversely, LPG's energy content by weight is higher than gasoline's due to a higher hydrogen-to-carbon ratio.

Octane rating

Spark-ignition engines are designed to burn gasoline in a controlled process called deflagration. However, the unburned mixture may autoignite by pressure and heat alone, rather than igniting from the spark plug at exactly the right time, causing a rapid pressure rise that can damage the engine. This is often referred to as engine knocking or end-gas knock. Knocking can be reduced by increasing the gasoline's resistance to autoignition, which is expressed by its octane rating.

Octane rating is measured relative to a mixture of 2,2,4-trimethylpentane (an isomer of octane) and n-heptane. There are different conventions for expressing octane ratings, so the same physical fuel may have several different octane ratings based on the measure used. One of the best known is the research octane number (RON).

The octane rating of typical commercially available gasoline varies by country. In Finland, Sweden, and Norway, 95 RON is the standard for regular unleaded gasoline and 98 RON is also available as a more expensive option.

In the United Kingdom, over 95 percent of gasoline sold has 95 RON and is marketed as Unleaded or Premium Unleaded. Super Unleaded, with 97/98 RON and branded high-performance fuels (e.g., Shell V-Power, BP Ultimate) with 99 RON make up the balance. Gasoline with 102 RON may rarely be available for racing purposes.

In the U.S., octane ratings in unleaded fuels vary between 85 and 87 AKI (91–92 RON) for regular, 89–90 AKI (94–95 RON) for mid-grade (equivalent to European regular), up to 90–94 AKI (95–99 RON) for premium (European premium).

Octane rating became important as the military sought higher output for aircraft engines in the late 1930s and the 1940s. A higher octane rating allows a higher compression ratio or supercharger boost, and thus higher temperatures and pressures, which translate to higher power output. Some scientists even predicted that a nation with a good supply of high-octane gasoline would have the advantage in air power. In 1943, the Rolls-Royce Merlin aero engine produced  using 100 RON fuel from a modest  displacement. By the time of Operation Overlord, both the RAF and USAAF were conducting some operations in Europe using 150 RON fuel (100/150 avgas), obtained by adding 2.5 percent aniline to 100-octane avgas. By this time, the Rolls-Royce Merlin 66 was developing  using this fuel.

Additives

Antiknock additives

Tetraethyl lead

Gasoline, when used in high-compression internal combustion engines, tends to auto-ignite or "detonate" causing damaging engine knocking (also called "pinging" or "pinking"). To address this problem, tetraethyl lead (TEL) was widely adopted as an additive for gasoline in the 1920s. With a growing awareness of the seriousness of the extent of environmental and health damage caused by lead compounds, however, and the incompatibility of lead with catalytic converters, governments began to mandate reductions in gasoline lead.

In the U.S., the Environmental Protection Agency issued regulations to reduce the lead content of leaded gasoline over a series of annual phases, scheduled to begin in 1973 but delayed by court appeals until 1976. By 1995, leaded fuel accounted for only 0.6 percent of total gasoline sales and under  of lead per year. From 1 January 1996, the U.S. Clean Air Act banned the sale of leaded fuel for use in on-road vehicles in the U.S. The use of TEL also necessitated other additives, such as dibromoethane.

European countries began replacing lead-containing additives by the end of the 1980s, and by the end of the 1990s, leaded gasoline was banned within the entire European Union. The UAE started to switch to unleaded in the early 2000s.

Reduction in the average lead content of human blood may be a major cause for falling violent crime rates around the world including South Africa. A study found a correlation between leaded gasoline usage and violent crime. Other studies found no correlation.()

In August 2021, the UN Environment Programme announced that leaded petrol had been eradicated worldwide, with Algeria being the last country to deplete its reserves. UN Secretary-General António Guterres called the eradication of leaded petrol an "international success story". He also added: "Ending the use of leaded petrol will prevent more than one million premature deaths each year from heart disease, strokes and cancer, and it will protect children whose IQs are damaged by exposure to lead". Greenpeace called the announcement "the end of one toxic era". However, leaded gasoline continues to be used in aeronautic, auto racing, and off-road applications. The use of leaded additives is still permitted worldwide for the formulation of some grades of aviation gasoline such as 100LL, because the required octane rating is difficult to reach without the use of leaded additives.

Different additives have replaced lead compounds. The most popular additives include aromatic hydrocarbons, ethers(MTBE and ETBE), and alcohols, most commonly ethanol.

Lead replacement petrol
Lead replacement petrol (LRP) was developed for vehicles designed to run on leaded fuels and incompatible with unleaded fuels. Rather than tetraethyllead, it contains other metals such as potassium compounds or methylcyclopentadienyl manganese tricarbonyl (MMT); these are purported to buffer soft exhaust valves and seats so that they do not suffer recession due to the use of unleaded fuel.

LRP was marketed during and after the phaseout of leaded motor fuels in the United Kingdom, Australia, South Africa, and some other countries. Consumer confusion led to a widespread mistaken preference for LRP rather than unleaded, and LRP was phased out 8 to 10 years after the introduction of unleaded.

Leaded gasoline was withdrawn from sale in Britain after 31 December 1999, seven years after EEC regulations signaled the end of production for cars using leaded gasoline in member states. At this stage, a large percentage of cars from the 1980s and early 1990s which ran on leaded gasoline were still in use, along with cars that could run on unleaded fuel. However, the declining number of such cars on British roads saw many gasoline stations withdrawing LRP from sale by 2003.

MMT
Methylcyclopentadienyl manganese tricarbonyl (MMT) is used in Canada and the U.S. to boost octane rating. Its use in the U.S. has been restricted by regulations, although it is currently allowed. Its use in the European Union is restricted by Article 8a of the Fuel Quality Directive following its testing under the Protocol for the evaluation of effects of metallic fuel-additives on the emissions performance of vehicles.

Fuel stabilizers (antioxidants and metal deactivators)

Gummy, sticky resin deposits result from oxidative degradation of gasoline during long-term storage. These harmful deposits arise from the oxidation of alkenes and other minor components in gasoline (see drying oils). Improvements in refinery techniques have generally reduced the susceptibility of gasolines to these problems. Previously, catalytically or thermally cracked gasolines were most susceptible to oxidation. The formation of gums is accelerated by copper salts, which can be neutralized by additives called metal deactivators.

This degradation can be prevented through the addition of 5–100 ppm of antioxidants, such as phenylenediamines and other amines. Hydrocarbons with a bromine number of 10 or above can be protected with the combination of unhindered or partially hindered phenols and oil-soluble strong amine bases, such as hindered phenols. "Stale" gasoline can be detected by a colorimetric enzymatic test for organic peroxides produced by oxidation of the gasoline.

Gasolines are also treated with metal deactivators, which are compounds that sequester (deactivate) metal salts that otherwise accelerate the formation of gummy residues. The metal impurities might arise from the engine itself or as contaminants in the fuel.

Detergents
Gasoline, as delivered at the pump, also contains additives to reduce internal engine carbon buildups, improve combustion and allow easier starting in cold climates. High levels of detergent can be found in Top Tier Detergent Gasolines. The specification for Top Tier Detergent Gasolines was developed by four automakers: GM, Honda, Toyota, and BMW. According to the bulletin, the minimal U.S. EPA requirement is not sufficient to keep engines clean. Typical detergents include alkylamines and alkyl phosphates at a level of 50–100 ppm.

Ethanol

European Union
In the EU, 5 percent ethanol can be added within the common gasoline spec (EN 228). Discussions are ongoing to allow 10 percent blending of ethanol (available in Finnish, French and German gasoline stations). In Finland, most gasoline stations sell 95E10, which is 10 percent ethanol, and 98E5, which is 5 percent ethanol. Most gasoline sold in Sweden has 5–15 percent ethanol added. Three different ethanol blends are sold in the Netherlands—E5, E10 and hE15. The last of these differs from standard ethanol–gasoline blends in that it consists of 15 percent hydrous ethanol (i.e., the ethanol–water azeotrope) instead of the anhydrous ethanol traditionally used for blending with gasoline.

Brazil
The Brazilian National Agency of Petroleum, Natural Gas and Biofuels (ANP) requires gasoline for automobile use to have 27.5 percent of ethanol added to its composition. Pure hydrated ethanol is also available as a fuel.

Australia
Legislation requires retailers to label fuels containing ethanol on the dispenser, and limits ethanol use to 10 percent of gasoline in Australia. Such gasoline is commonly called E10 by major brands, and it is cheaper than regular unleaded gasoline.

U.S. 
The federal Renewable Fuel Standard (RFS) effectively requires refiners and blenders to blend renewable biofuels(mostly ethanol) with gasoline, sufficient to meet a growing annual target of total gallons blended. Although the mandate does not require a specific percentage of ethanol, annual increases in the target combined with declining gasoline consumption have caused the typical ethanol content in gasoline to approach 10 percent. Most fuel pumps display a sticker that states that the fuel may contain up to 10 percent ethanol, an intentional disparity that reflects the varying actual percentage. Until late 2010, fuel retailers were only authorized to sell fuel containing up to 10 percent ethanol (E10), and most vehicle warranties (except for flexible fuel vehicles) authorize fuels that contain no more than 10 percent ethanol. In parts of the U.S., ethanol is sometimes added to gasoline without an indication that it is a component.

India
In October 2007, the Government of India decided to make five percent ethanol blending (with gasoline) mandatory. Currently, 10 percent ethanol blended product (E10) is being sold in various parts of the country. Ethanol has been found in at least one study to damage catalytic converters.

Dyes

Though gasoline is a naturally colorless liquid, many gasolines are dyed in various colors to indicate their composition and acceptable uses. In Australia, the lowest grade of gasoline (RON 91) was dyed a light shade of red/orange and is now the same color as the medium grade (RON 95) and high octane (RON 98), which are dyed yellow. In the U.S., aviation gasoline (avgas) is dyed to identify its octane rating and to distinguish it from kerosene-based jet fuel, which is clear. In Canada, the gasoline for marine and farm use is dyed red and is not subject to sales tax.

Oxygenate blending
Oxygenate blending adds oxygen-bearing compounds such as MTBE, ETBE, TAME, TAEE, ethanol, and biobutanol. The presence of these oxygenates reduces the amount of carbon monoxide and unburned fuel in the exhaust. In many areas throughout the U.S., oxygenate blending is mandated by EPA regulations to reduce smog and other airborne pollutants. For example, in Southern California fuel must contain two percent oxygen by weight, resulting in a mixture of 5.6 percent ethanol in gasoline. The resulting fuel is often known as reformulated gasoline (RFG) or oxygenated gasoline, or, in the case of California, California reformulated gasoline. The federal requirement that RFG contain oxygen was dropped on 6 May 2006 because the industry had developed VOC-controlled RFG that did not need additional oxygen.

MTBE was phased out in the U.S. due to groundwater contamination and the resulting regulations and lawsuits. Ethanol and, to a lesser extent, ethanol-derived ETBE are common substitutes. A common ethanol-gasoline mix of 10 percent ethanol mixed with gasoline is called gasohol or E10, and an ethanol-gasoline mix of 85 percent ethanol mixed with gasoline is called E85. The most extensive use of ethanol takes place in Brazil, where the ethanol is derived from sugarcane. E85 is slowly becoming available in much of the U.S., though many of the relatively few stations vending E85 are not open to the general public.

The use of bioethanol and bio-methanol, either directly or indirectly by conversion of ethanol to bio-ETBE, or methanol to bio-MTBE is encouraged by the European Union Directive on the Promotion of the use of biofuels and other renewable fuels for transport. Since producing bioethanol from fermented sugars and starches involves distillation, though, ordinary people in much of Europe cannot legally ferment and distill their own bioethanol at present (unlike in the U.S., where getting a BATF distillation permit has been easy since the 1973 oil crisis).

Safety

Toxicity
The safety data sheet for a 2003 Texan unleaded gasoline shows at least 15 hazardous chemicals occurring in various amounts, including benzene (up to five percent by volume), toluene (up to 35 percent by volume), naphthalene (up to one percent by volume), trimethylbenzene (up to seven percent by volume), methyl tert-butyl ether (MTBE) (up to 18 percent by volume, in some states), and about 10 others. Hydrocarbons in gasoline generally exhibit low acute toxicities, with LD50 of 700–2700 mg/kg for simple aromatic compounds. Benzene and many antiknocking additives are carcinogenic.

People can be exposed to gasoline in the workplace by swallowing it, breathing in vapors, skin contact, and eye contact. Gasoline is toxic. The National Institute for Occupational Safety and Health (NIOSH) has also designated gasoline as a carcinogen. Physical contact, ingestion, or inhalation can cause health problems. Since ingesting large amounts of gasoline can cause permanent damage to major organs, a call to a local poison control center or emergency room visit is indicated.

Contrary to common misconception, swallowing gasoline does not generally require special emergency treatment, and inducing vomiting does not help, and can make it worse. According to poison specialist Brad Dahl, "even two mouthfuls wouldn't be that dangerous as long as it goes down to your stomach and stays there or keeps going". The U.S. CDC's Agency for Toxic Substances and Disease Registry says not to induce vomiting, lavage, or administer activated charcoal.

Inhalation for intoxication
Inhaled (huffed) gasoline vapor is a common intoxicant. Users concentrate and inhale gasoline vapor in a manner not intended by the manufacturer to produce euphoria and intoxication. Gasoline inhalation has become epidemic in some poorer communities and indigenous groups in Australia, Canada, New Zealand, and some Pacific Islands. The practice is thought to cause severe organ damage, along with other effects such as intellectual disability and various cancers.

In Canada, Native children in the isolated Northern Labrador community of Davis Inlet were the focus of national concern in 1993, when many were found to be sniffing gasoline. The Canadian and provincial Newfoundland and Labrador governments intervened on several occasions, sending many children away for treatment. Despite being moved to the new community of Natuashish in 2002, serious inhalant abuse problems have continued. Similar problems were reported in Sheshatshiu in 2000 and also in Pikangikum First Nation. In 2012, the issue once again made the news media in Canada.

Australia has long faced a petrol (gasoline) sniffing problem in isolated and impoverished aboriginal communities. Although some sources argue that sniffing was introduced by U.S. servicemen stationed in the nation's Top End during World War II or through experimentation by 1940s-era Cobourg Peninsula sawmill workers, other sources claim that inhalant abuse (such as glue inhalation) emerged in Australia in the late 1960s. Chronic, heavy petrol sniffing appears to occur among remote, impoverished indigenous communities, where the ready accessibility of petrol has helped to make it a common substance for abuse.

In Australia, petrol sniffing now occurs widely throughout remote Aboriginal communities in the Northern Territory, Western Australia, northern parts of South Australia, and Queensland. The number of people sniffing petrol goes up and down over time as young people experiment or sniff occasionally. "Boss", or chronic, sniffers may move in and out of communities; they are often responsible for encouraging young people to take it up. In 2005, the Government of Australia and BP Australia began the usage of Opal fuel in remote areas prone to petrol sniffing. Opal is a non-sniffable fuel (which is much less likely to cause a high) and has made a difference in some indigenous communities.

Flammability

Like other hydrocarbons, gasoline burns in a limited range of its vapor phase, and, coupled with its volatility, this makes leaks highly dangerous when sources of ignition are present. Gasoline has a lower explosive limit of 1.4 percent by volume and an upper explosive limit of 7.6 percent. If the concentration is below 1.4 percent, the air-gasoline mixture is too lean and does not ignite. If the concentration is above 7.6 percent, the mixture is too rich and also does not ignite. However, gasoline vapor rapidly mixes and spreads with air, making unconstrained gasoline quickly flammable.

Gasoline exhaust

The exhaust gas generated by burning gasoline is harmful to both the environment and to human health. After CO is inhaled into the human body, it readily combines with hemoglobin in the blood, and its affinity is 300 times that of oxygen. Therefore, the hemoglobin in the lungs combines with CO instead of oxygen, causing the human body to be hypoxic, causing headaches, dizziness, vomiting, and other poisoning symptoms. In severe cases, it may lead to death. Hydrocarbons only affect the human body when their concentration is quite high, and their toxicity level depends on the chemical composition. The hydrocarbons produced by incomplete combustion include alkanes, aromatics, and aldehydes. Among them, a concentration of methane and ethane over  will cause loss of consciousness or suffocation, a concentration of pentane and hexane over  will have an anesthetic effect, and aromatic hydrocarbons will have more serious effects on health, blood toxicity, neurotoxicity, and cancer. If the concentration of benzene exceeds 40 ppm, it can cause leukemia, and xylene can cause headache, dizziness, nausea, and vomiting. Human exposure to large amounts of aldehydes can cause eye irritation, nausea, and dizziness. In addition to carcinogenic effects, long-term exposure can cause damage to the skin, liver, kidneys, and cataracts. After NOx enters the alveoli, it has a severe stimulating effect on the lung tissue. It can irritate the conjunctiva of the eyes, cause tearing, and cause pink eyes. It also has a stimulating effect on the nose, pharynx, throat, and other organs. It can cause acute wheezing, breathing difficulties, red eyes, sore throat, and dizziness causing poisoning.

Environmental impact 
In recent years, with the rapid development of the motor vehicle economy, the production and use of motor vehicles have increased dramatically, and the pollution by motor vehicle exhaust to the environment has become more and more serious. The air pollution in many large cities has changed from coal-burning pollution to "motor vehicle pollution". In the U.S., transportation is the largest source of carbon emissions, accounting for 30 percent of the total carbon footprint of the U.S. Combustion of gasoline produces  of carbon dioxide, a greenhouse gas.

Unburnt gasoline and evaporation from the tank, when in the atmosphere, react in sunlight to produce photochemical smog. Vapor pressure initially rises with some addition of ethanol to gasoline, but the increase is greatest at 10 percent by volume. At higher concentrations of ethanol above 10 percent, the vapor pressure of the blend starts to decrease. At a 10 percent ethanol by volume, the rise in vapor pressure may potentially increase the problem of photochemical smog. This rise in vapor pressure could be mitigated by increasing or decreasing the percentage of ethanol in the gasoline mixture. The chief risks of such leaks come not from vehicles, but gasoline delivery truck accidents and leaks from storage tanks. Because of this risk, most (underground) storage tanks now have extensive measures in place to detect and prevent any such leaks, such as monitoring systems (Veeder-Root, Franklin Fueling).

Production of gasoline consumes  of water by driven distance.

Gasoline use causes a variety of deleterious effects to the human population and to the climate generally. The harms imposed include a higher rate of premature death and ailments, such as asthma, caused by air pollution, higher healthcare costs for the public generally, decreased crop yields, missed work and school days due to illness, increased flooding and other extreme weather events linked to global climate change, and other social costs. The costs imposed on society and the planet are estimated to be $3.80 per gallon of gasoline, in addition to the price paid at the pump by the user. The damage to the health and climate caused by a gasoline-powered vehicle greatly exceeds that caused by electric vehicles.

Carbon dioxide

About  of carbon dioxide (CO2) are produced from burning gasoline that does not contain ethanol. Most of the retail gasoline now sold in the U.S. contains about 10 percent fuel ethanol (or E10) by volume.

Worldwide 7 liters of gasoline are burnt for every 100 km driven by cars and vans. Despite increasing sales of electric cars and falling sales of gasoline cars, those gasoline cars that are sold tend to be larger and heavier as more are SUVs, thus gasoline combustion and carbon dioxide emissions per km have not fallen significantly.

Also the International Energy Agency said in 2021 that: "To ensure fuel economy and CO2 emissions standards are effective, governments must continue regulatory efforts to monitor and reduce the gap between real-world fuel economy and rated performance."

Contamination of soil and water
Gasoline enters the environment through the soil, groundwater, surface water, and air. Therefore, humans may be exposed to gasoline through methods such as breathing, eating, and skin contact. For example, using gasoline-filled equipment, such as lawnmowers, drinking gasoline-contaminated water close to gasoline spills or leaks to the soil, working at a gasoline station, inhaling gasoline volatile gas when refueling at a gasoline station is the easiest way to be exposed to gasoline.

Use and pricing
The International Energy Agency said in 2021 that "road fuels should be taxed at a rate that reflects their impact on people’s health and the climate".

Europe
Countries in Europe impose substantially higher taxes on fuels such as gasoline when compared to the U.S. The price of gasoline in Europe is typically higher than that in the U.S. due to this difference.

U.S. 

California prices are higher because the California government mandates unique California gasoline formulas and taxes.

In the U.S., most consumer goods bear pre-tax prices, but gasoline prices are posted with taxes included. Taxes are added by federal, state, and local governments.

About nine percent of all gasoline sold in the U.S. in May 2009 was premium grade, according to the Energy Information Administration. Consumer Reports magazine says, "If [your owner's manual] says to use regular fuel, do so—there's no advantage to a higher grade." The Associated Press said premium gas—which has a higher octane rating and costs more per gallon than regular unleaded—should be used only if the manufacturer says it is "required". Cars with turbocharged engines and high compression ratios often specify premium gasoline because higher octane fuels reduce the incidence of "knock", or fuel pre-detonation. The price of gasoline varies considerably between the summer and winter months.

There is a considerable difference between summer oil and winter oil in gasoline vapor pressure (Reid Vapor Pressure, RVP), which is a measure of how easily the fuel evaporates at a given temperature. The higher the gasoline volatility (the higher the RVP), the easier it is to evaporate. The conversion between the two fuels occurs twice a year, once in autumn (winter mix) and the other in spring (summer mix). The winter blended fuel has a higher RVP because the fuel must be able to evaporate at a low temperature for the engine to run normally. If the RVP is too low on a cold day, the vehicle will be difficult to start; however, the summer blended gasoline has a lower RVP. It prevents excessive evaporation when the outdoor temperature rises, reduces ozone emissions, and reduces smog levels. At the same time, vapor lock is less likely to occur in hot weather.

Gasoline production by country

Comparison with other fuels

Below is a table of the energy density (per volume) and specific energy (per mass) of various transportation fuels as compared with gasoline. In the rows with gross and net, they are from the Oak Ridge National Laboratory's Transportation Energy Data Book.

See also

Notes

References

Bibliography

 Gold, Russell. The Boom: How Fracking Ignited the American Energy Revolution and Changed the World (Simon & Schuster, 2014).
 Yergin, Daniel. The Quest: Energy, Security, and the Remaking of the Modern World (Penguin, 2011).
 Yergin, Daniel. The Prize: The Epic Quest for Oil, Money, and Power (Buccaneer Books, 1994; latest edition: Reissue Press, 2008).
 Graph of inflation-corrected historic prices, 1970–2005. Highest in 2005 
 The Low-Down on High Octane Gasoline
 MMT-US EPA 
 An introduction to the modern petroleum science , and to the Russian-Ukrainian theory of deep, abiotic petroleum origins.
 What's the difference between premium and regular gas?  (from The Straight Dope)
 International Fuel Prices 2005 with diesel and gasoline prices of 172 countries
 EIA—Gasoline and Diesel Fuel Update
 World Internet News: "Big Oil Looking for Another Government Handout", April 2006.
 Durability of various plastics: Alcohols vs. Gasoline 
 Dismissal of the Claims of a Biological Connection for Natural petroleum.
 Fuel Economy Impact Analysis of RFG  i.e. reformulated gasoline. Has lower heating value data, actual energy content is higher see higher heating value
  , 'A Refiner's Viewpoint on Motor Fuel Quality' About the fuel specs refiners can control. Holaday W, and Happel J. (SAE paper 430113, 1943).

External links

 CNN/Money: Global gas prices
 EEP: European gas prices
 Transportation Energy Data Book
 Energy Supply Logistics Searchable Directory of US Terminals
 High octane fuel, leaded and LRP gasoline—article from robotpig.net
 CDC – NIOSH Pocket Guide to Chemical Hazards
 Aviation Fuel Map
 Comparison of Regular, Midgrade, and Premium Fuel
Images
 Down the Gasoline Trail Handy Jam Organization, 1935 (Cartoon)

IARC Group 2B carcinogens
Liquid fuels
Petroleum products
Inhalants